Passage Home is a 1955 British drama film directed by Roy Ward Baker.

Plot
Captain "Lucky" Ryland (Peter Finch) is about to retire. He has a flashback of several years to a voyage on a merchant ship which he was captaining from South America. He is forced to give passage to a British governess, Ruth Elton (Diane Cilento), who is returning to England.

Both Ryland and his second mate, Vosper (Anthony Steel), fall for Ruth. Ryland proposes to Ruth and when she turns down his offer he tries to rape her in his cabin but she is rescued by Vosper. The ship survives a very severe storm in which Vosper saves Ruth's life outside on deck after which Ruth and Vosper realize that they are in love with each other.

There is a subplot about the dissatisfaction of the ship's crew with being fed rotten potatoes, which Ryland has bought cheaply simply to save money. Ryland says a good cook would still be able to use them productively. The potatoes are dumped overboard and Ryland is determined to find out who is responsible by offering the crew £5 for any information as to who did it. Vosper accuses Shorty (Bryan Forbes), who is acting oddly, and they fight. Ike (Geoffrey Keen) intervenes and fights Vosper. Shorty then confesses to Ike but Ike takes the blame. Probably due to the fight, Ike, who is already known to be ill, takes to his bed and dies. He is buried at sea in a makeshift coffin.

At the allotted time of the funeral Ryland is drunk, drowning his sorrow in whisky due to being rejected by Ruth (whom he had seriously assaulted, ripping her dress). The red ensign is flown at half mast. Ryland struggles to find the right pages in the Book of Common Prayer and loses his place. When the body is slid overboard they recite the Lord's Prayer.

That night Ryland is even more drunk. The steward brings his dinner and he rudely demands that he "do his job" and tidy his room. A violent storm is throwing things around. The ship is in trouble but Ryland musters himself and manages to give logical instructions to get her through the storm. Down below the engineer struggles to keep up the power. In the hold things start sliding and Shorty is crushed by a crate holding a bull while pushing Burns to safety. They head for "The Lizard". Ruth goes on deck and is in danger of being swept away  when part of the safety railing is destroyed. Vosper saves her and carries her to her cabin where they kiss.

Coming out of flashback, Ruth and Vosper are now married and are attending Ryland's retirement function. Ryland shakes her hand and calls her "Mrs Vosper". The film ends with Ruth looking at Ryland in tears because she still has feelings for Ryland after all of the years.

Cast
 Anthony Steel as Second Mate Vosper 
 Peter Finch as Captain Lucky Ryland 
 Diane Cilento as Ruth Elton 
 Cyril Cusack as Bohannon the steward 
 Geoffrey Keen as Ike the bosun 
 Hugh Griffith as Pettigrew the engineer
 Duncan Lamont as 1st Mate Llewellyn 
 Gordon Jackson as Ted Burns 
 Bryan Forbes as Shorty 
 Michael Craig as Burton 
 Robert Brown as Shane 
 Martin Benson as Gutierres 
 Patrick McGoohan as McIsaacs 
 Michael Bryant as Stebbings 
 Sam Kydd as Sheltia 
 Glyn Houston as Charley Boy
 Patrick Westwood as Oglethorpe
 George Woodbridge as Yorkie

Production
The film was based on a novel by Richard Armstrong that was published in 1953.

It was Roy Ward Baker's first film after working several years in Hollywood. Baker's biographer would later write "although he [Baker] was disappointed in the eventual result Passage Home was the quintessential 1940s and 1950s Baker film - classical in style and melodramatic/generic in its basic structure... it conveys a quiet, pervasive sense of despair in its storyline, involving melancholy and sexual repression."

The script was by William Fairchild who had written Morning Departure, alo directed by Baker. The director called it "a bomb in the bomb locker story... all pretty formula stuff. It's not very good... The whole film should have been set in 1885 on a sailing ship. It was sort of a Victorian  film. It just didn't work as a modern day film." He added "there was
this fatal flaw, it was an old-fashioned story in an almost contemporary setting and it didn’t
really work."

Baker felt the "only interesting thing about" the film was it used a new form of back projection.

Diane Cilento's casting was announced in September 1954. She was cast after producer Julian Wintle had seen 60 people. Cilento had only recently appeared on stage in The Big Knife and signed a five year contract with Alex Korda.

Her co star was Peter Finch, a fellow Australian.

The film was shot at Pinewood Studios in November 1954. It was the first film Finch made under a new five year contract with the Rank Organisation.

It was also the first film Michael Craig made under contract to Rank. He said filming went for over three months and was impressed by the set, saying "the art department, if no one else, had one use proud."

Reception
Baker said "the film went out and they probably made a bit of money on it. It was certainly
well made. It was a splendid production, storm sequences and all that stuff."

Filmink argued the film would have been more successful if a war film.

References

External links

Passage Home at Britmovie
Passage Home at Letterbox DVD
Passage Home at BFI

1955 films
1950s mystery drama films
British black-and-white films
British mystery drama films
Films directed by Roy Ward Baker
Films based on British novels
Films scored by Clifton Parker
Films shot at Pinewood Studios
1955 drama films
1950s English-language films
1950s British films